Stian Kvarstad (born 25 January 1973) is a retired Norwegian ski jumper.

In the World Cup he finished once among the top 10, with a seventh place from Vikersund in February 1998.

References

1973 births
Living people
Norwegian male ski jumpers
Place of birth missing (living people)